Cardinal Gibbons High School (CGHS) is a private coeducational college-preparatory Catholic high school in Raleigh, North Carolina. Cardinal Gibbons and St. Thomas More Academy are the only Catholic high schools in Raleigh, and two of three high schools in the Diocese of Raleigh.

History
Cardinal Gibbons was originally called Sacred Heart High School, and was the first Roman Catholic High School in Raleigh, North Carolina.  The school was originally at the Pulaski Cowper mansion, which was later transformed into Sacred Heart Cathedral, the smallest cathedral in the continental United States.  The school was later named "Cathedral Latin High School."  In 1962 a new school building opened on Western Boulevard in Raleigh and the school was renamed "Cardinal Gibbons Memorial High School." The site was used for an orphanage until the 1950s. Cathedral School still exists as an elementary and middle school which feeds into Cardinal Gibbons High.  The school currently occupies a campus on Edwards Mill Rd. which was completed in 1999. The former school site is the new location for Holy Name of Jesus Cathedral.

Athletics 
Cardinal Gibbons are members of the North Carolina High School Athletic Association (NCHSAA), and are currently classified as a 4A high school. The schools team name is the Crusaders, with the school colors being green and gold. Listed below are sports offered at Cardinal Gibbons.

Boys sports: Baseball, Basketball, Cross Country, Football, Golf, Lacrosse, Soccer, Swimming, Tennis, Track & Field, Wrestling
Girls sports: Basketball, Cheerleading, Cross Country, Dance Team, Field Hockey, Golf, Lacrosse, Soccer, Softball, Swimming, Tennis, Track & Field, Volleyball

The 2021 Cardinal Gibbons Crusaders football team won the school's first football state championship, by defeating the Julius L. Chambers Cougars 14-2 in the 4A state championship game at Carter-Finley Stadium in Raleigh, NC.

Notable alumni
 Vernetta Alston, politician and lawyer
 Claire Curzan, qualified for the 2020 Summer Olympics in 100 meter butterfly
 Conor Donovan, professional soccer player
 Christina Gibbons, professional soccer player
 Jeremy Kelly, professional soccer player
 Morgan Reid, professional soccer player
 Julie Shea, runner and politician
 Leigh Smith, qualified for the 2008 Summer Olympics in the javelin throw

See also

National Catholic Educational Association
St. Thomas More Academy

References

External links
Official website
Roman Catholic Diocese of Raleigh, North Carolina

Private schools in Raleigh, North Carolina
Catholic secondary schools in North Carolina
Roman Catholic Diocese of Raleigh
Educational institutions established in 1909
1909 establishments in North Carolina